"Walkin', Talkin', Cryin', Barely Beatin' Broken Heart" is a song written by Roger Miller and Justin Tubb. It was first recorded by American country music artist Johnnie Wright, whose version peaked at number 22 on the Billboard Hot Country Singles chart in 1964. American country music group Highway 101 covered the song on their 1989 album Paint the Town and it was released as the album's second single in January 1990. Their version reached number 4 on the Billboard Hot Country Singles & Tracks chart in April 1990.

Music video
The music video was directed by Michael Merriman and premiered in early 1990.

Chart performance

Johnnie Wright

Highway 101

Year-end charts

References

1964 singles
1990 singles
Johnnie Wright songs
Highway 101 songs
Songs written by Roger Miller
Song recordings produced by Paul Worley
Songs written by Justin Tubb
Warner Records singles
1964 songs